Rakhimova is a surname. Notable people with the surname include:

Ibodat Rakhimova, Soviet-Tajikistani politician
Kamilla Rakhimova (born 2001), Russian female tennis player
Sevinch Rakhimova, Uzbekistani karateka

Surnames of Uzbekistani origin
Azerbaijani-language surnames
Kazakh-language surnames
Kyrgyz-language surnames
Russian-language surnames
Tajik-language surnames
Turkmen-language surnames
Uzbek-language surnames